KCVB-LD (channel 26) is a low-power independent television station licensed to Logan, Utah, United States. Founded on November 30, 1993, the station is owned by Cache Valley Broadcasting, Inc. Its transmitter is located south of the Cache Valley, near Brigham City, Utah.

History
KCVB-LD began on November 30, 1993 with the grant of an original construction permit to Valley Channel Broadcasting, Inc., later known as KUTN LLC and Cache Valley Broadcasting LLC. Originally built on VHF channel 12, it was given the callsign K12OT and was licensed on April 1, 1994. The station aired classified ads and some local programming. In November 1996, the station took the call letters KVWB-LP as a Network One affiliate , then changed to KUTN-LP in December 1997. When full-service television station KUTH (now KUTF) was granted a construction permit for channel 12 in October 1999, KUTN-LP was forced to find a new broadcast frequency. They applied to move to channel 3 in November 2000, and by July 2001, had applied for a license for their new facilities. At the same time, the station was again renamed, this time to KCVB-LP, which changed to KCVB-CA upon the station being granted a Class A license on August 28, 2001, along with the license to cover the move to channel 3. The station's call sign was changed again on January 12, 2012 to KCVB-CD, then on January 10, 2023 to the current KCVB-LD.

On February 15, 2023, Bridge Media Networks (the parent company of 24/7 headline news service NewsNet, backed by 5-hour Energy creator Manoj Bhargava) announced it would acquire KCVB-LD for $150,000. Upon the completion of the transaction, KCVB-LD will become the first NewsNet-owned and operated station in the state of Utah.

Technical information

Programming
KCVB-CD airs an abbreviated Ion Television schedule, with network shows only from 7 pm - 9 pm weekdays. The full Ion Television schedule is carried on owned-and-operated station KUPX-TV, which is available on cable in Logan. The majority of KCVB-CD's schedule is local programming, with infomercials overnight. Cache Valley Today is a local one-hour talk show that airs seven times during each weekday, and Let's Talk Cache Valley is a local half-hour talk show that airs weekdays, once a day, although at a different time each day. KCVB-CD shows hockey games from local Utah State University and basketball games from a local high school.

References

 Cache Vision, The Utah Statesman, February 9, 2005

External links
Official site
TV Fool Map for KCVB

Ion Television affiliates
CVB-LD
Television channels and stations established in 1993
Low-power television stations in the United States